James Aloysius Walsh (July 24, 1897 – May 29, 1960) was a United States Navy sailor and a recipient of the U.S. military's highest decoration, the Medal of Honor, for his role in the occupation of Veracruz. Only 16 at the time of his actions, he was possibly the youngest recipient of the Medal in the 20th century.

On that day and the next, he participated in the capture of the Mexican port city of Veracruz. For his "extraordinary heroism" during the battle, he was awarded the Medal of Honor two months later, on June 15.

Walsh reached the commissioned officer rank of lieutenant before leaving the Navy. He died at age 62 and was buried at Long Island National Cemetery in Farmingdale, New York.

Medal of Honor citation
 Rank and organization: Seaman, U.S. Navy.
 Born: 24 July 1897 New York, N.Y.
 Entered service at: New York, N.Y.
 G.O. No.: 101, 15 June 1914.

Citation:

On board the U.S.S. Florida; for extraordinary heroism in the line of his profession during the seizure of Vera Cruz Mexico, 21 and 22 April 1914.

See also

List of Medal of Honor recipients (Veracruz)

References

1897 births
1960 deaths
Military personnel from New York City
United States Navy sailors
United States Navy Medal of Honor recipients
Battle of Veracruz (1914) recipients of the Medal of Honor